Hydroptère is a French experimental sailing hydrofoil trimaran imagined by the yachtman Éric Tabarly. The Hydroptère project was managed by Alain Thébault, the design done by naval architects VPLP design and the manufacturing by a group of French high-tech companies. Its multihull hydrofoil design allows the sail-powered vessel to reach high speeds on water. The design is based on experience from a range of hydrofoil sailcraft that Thébault built in cooperation with Éric Tabarly since the 1980s. On 21 December 2008, the Hydroptère briefly reached  near Fos-sur-Mer, but capsized and turtled shortly thereafter.

Abandonment and sale
During July 2015, the Hydroptère sailed 2215 nautical miles from Los Angeles to Honolulu and docked in Kewalo Harbor. On 15 March 2016 the Harbor Master posted an "Abandoned Vessel" notice on the Hydroptère which was subsequently sold at auction. 
In June 2019, L'Hydroptère was bought by Chris Welsh (USA) and Gabriel Terrasse (FRA). In November 2019, l'Hydroptère was sailed from Honolulu, Hawaii to San Francisco, California by professional sailor Mike Price and a delivery crew so that she could undergo an extensive re-fit.

See also
 Hydrofoil
 Sailing hydrofoil
 World Sailing Speed Record Council
 Speed sailing record
 Speed sailing

References

External links

 Hydroptère 2.0 official site
 Real-time Model at EPA
  Youtube Video of Hydroptère
 4 September 2009, world record video (51.36 kts) on Youtube
 www.hbm.com (The Worlds Fastest Sailing Boat using HBM Measurement Technology)

Hydrofoils
Multihulls
2000s sailing yachts